Tersanjung the Movie is a 2021 Indonesian film directed by Pandu Adjisurya, Hanung Bramantyo and Nur Jihat Hisyam, written by Hanung Bramantyo and Pandu Adjisurya and starring Clara Bernadeth, Giorgino Abraham
and Kevin Ardillova.

Cast 
 Clara Bernadeth as Yura Diandra Hartono
 Giorgino Abraham as Christian Salim, Yura's bestfriend-turned-boyfriend
 Kevin Ardilova as Oka Saputra, Yura's bestfriend-turned-husband
 Nugie as Gerry Hartono, Yura and Nisa's father, Diandra's ex-husband, Indah's husband
 Kinaryosih as Indah Besari, Yura's stepmother, Nisa's mother, Gerry's second wife
 Alya Rohali as Nisa, Gerry and Indah's daughter, Yura's half-sister
 Ernanto Kusuma as Somad, Michelle's wife, Oka's father
 Sacha Stevenson as Michelle, Somad's husband, Oka's mother
 Febby Febiola as Rachel, Christian's mother, Salim's wife
 Ari Wibowo as Salim, Christian's father, Rachel's husband
 Marthino Lio as Bobby Sadewo, Yura's ex-fiancé
 Djenar Maesa Ayu as Mrs. Sadewo, Bobby's mother
 Enditha as Diandra, Yura's biological mother, Gerry's deceased wife
 Jenny Zhang as Grace, Rachel's assistant
 Bebe Gracia as Young Yura

Release
It was released on April 1, 2021 on Netflix streaming.

References

External links 
 
 

2021 films
Indonesian drama films
Indonesian-language films
Indonesian-language Netflix original films